The Suspect is a 2013 film written and directed by Stuart Connelly. It stars Mekhi Phifer in the titular role, and premiered at the 2013 American Black Film Festival. It was nominated for six awards.

Main cast 
Mekhi Phifer as The Suspect
William Sadler as Sheriff Dixon
Sterling K. Brown as The Other Suspect

References

External links 

Filmadelphia

2013 films
2013 thriller films
2010s English-language films